The 1954–55 Maccabi Haifa season was the club's 42nd season since its establishment, in 1913, and 7th since the establishment of the State of Israel.

During the season, the club competed in Liga Alef (top division) and the State Cup.

Review and events
Although league matches from the previous season ended on 13 March 1954, the confirmation of the league's final standings was delayed, as a match between Maccabi Haifa and Maccabi Petah Tikva, which was played on 26 December 1953 and ended with a 3–2 win for Haifa, was claimed to be fixed, to allow Maccabi Haifa to win. Eventually, on 10 January 1955, the IFA decided to replay the match in a neutral venue, Maccabi Haifa won the rematch 4–1 and secured their spot in the top division.
 The club played one international friendly match during the season, against APOEL FC, on 9 April 1955. Maccabi Haifa won the match 2–0, with goals scored by Held and Hardy.

Match Results

Legend

Liga Alef
 
League matches began on 6 February 1955, and by the time the season, only 20 rounds of matches were completed, delaying the end of the league season to the next season. Before the start of the season, Maccabi Haifa played one match to complete the 1953–54 Liga Alef season.

League table (as of 2 July 1955)

Source:

Matches

1953–54 Liga Alef

1954–55 Liga Alef

Results by match

State Cup

References

 

Maccabi Haifa F.C. seasons
Maccabi Haifa